Pat Ramsey is a retired Social Democratic and Labour Party (SDLP) politician from Derry, Northern Ireland. He is a former Mayor of Derry,  and was a Member of the Northern Ireland Assembly (MLA) for Foyle from 2003 to 2015, when he stood down.
He is the current SDLP Spokesperson for Employment and Learning, and is Chief Whip of the Party. He is a member of several All-Party Groups, such as Diabetes, Learning Disability, and Pro-life. 

He has been subject to numerous attacks on his home in the Bogside and his young daughter was injured in an attack on his office. The attackers were reported to be dissident republicans.

References

External links
 Profile, SDLP.ie; accessed 15 May 2016.

1958 births
Living people
Mayors of Derry
Northern Ireland MLAs 2003–2007
Northern Ireland MLAs 2007–2011
Northern Ireland MLAs 2011–2016
Social Democratic and Labour Party MLAs